MV Glen Sannox is a dual-fuel car and passenger ferry currently under construction at Ferguson Marine in Port Glasgow for Caledonian MacBrayne. Initially expected to enter service in summer 2018 at a cost of £97 million, the ship has been the subject of an ongoing political scandal known as the "ferry fiasco" owing to increased costs and lengthy delays to her construction.

History
MV Glen Sannox is to be the first of two Scottish ferries capable of operating on either marine diesel oil or liquefied natural gas (LNG), with benefits of a marked reduction in carbon dioxide, sulphur and nitrous oxide emissions. Her name was chosen from a short list by public ballot and recalls an earlier Arran ferry.

The first steel was cut on 7 April 2016 and Glen Sannox was launched on 21 November 2017 by the First Minister Nicola Sturgeon, It has been reported that the vessel's bulbous bow was not fit for purpose at the time of the launch, and only fitted to be able to claim "milestone payments" from the Scottish Government. The bridge windows were painted on, and the funnels were not operational, but only for show for the launch.

In August 2018, new Cabinet Secretary for Transport Michael Matheson said it had been confirmed that the ship was to be delivered in June 2019, followed by two months of crew familiarisation and sea trials. Further dispute over the contract overrun led to the shipyard going into administration and being nationalised by the Scottish Government.

A report produced after nationalisation indicated that Glen Sannox should be handed over to Caledonian Maritime Assets Ltd (CMAL) in the last quarter of 2021 and that completing the two ferries was likely to increase the total cost to over £207 million. In April 2020, Ferguson Marine contracted with International Contract Engineering, a marine design consultant, to revise the design and outfitting of Glen Sannox in advance of her eventual delivery.

On 10 August 2020, tugs moved Glen Sannox to the Garvel dry dock in Greenock for remedial work including replacement of the bulbous bow, paintwork repair and removal of marine growth. After additional work, the ship returned to the Fergusons shipyard in Port Glasgow on 9 September 2020.

In October 2022, it was announced that Glen Sannox would initially operate only on marine diesel oil, as vacuum sensors required for the LNG system were not available.

Service

She was originally expected to enter service early in 2018. Construction delays led to her launch being pushed back to November 2017, with the ship then expected to begin operation in winter 2018/19. After further delays, handover was expected between March and May 2023—five years late. On March 16, 2023, it was reported that further delays have pushed the Vessel's entry into service to Autmun of 2023. 

Further delays to both ferries and increasing costs of £250 million, subsequently rising to £340 million by September 2022 have resulted in controversy surrounding the contract and the lack of transparency in the decision-making process. The Scottish Government announced that key documents relating to the decision-making process had gone missing.

References

2017 ships
Caledonian MacBrayne
Ships built on the River Clyde